CHFG-FM is a First Nations community radio station that operates at 101.1 MHz (FM) in Chisasibi, Quebec, Canada.

The station is owned by the James Bay Cree Communications Society, through licensee Chisasibi Telecommunications Association.

External links
http://www.creeradio.com 

Hfg
Hfg
Year of establishment missing